The 1992 Cal State Fullerton Titans baseball team represented California State University, Fullerton in the 1992 NCAA Division I baseball season. The Titans played their home games at Titan Field. The team was coached by Augie Garrido in his 17th season at Cal State Fullerton.

The Titans lost the College World Series, defeated by the Pepperdine Waves in the championship game.

Roster

Schedule 

! style="" | Regular Season
|- valign="top" 

|- align="center" bgcolor="#ffcccc"
| February 3 ||  || Amerige Park || 2–3 || 0–1 || –
|- align="center" bgcolor="#ffcccc"
| February 8 || at  || Sunken Diamond || 2–4 || 0–2 || –
|- align="center" bgcolor="#ccffcc"
| February 8 || at Sanford || Sunken Diamond || 8–3 || 1–2 || –
|- align="center" bgcolor="#ccffcc"
| February 9 || at Sanford || Sunken Diamond || 3–1 || 2–2 || –
|- align="center" bgcolor="#ccffcc"
| February 14 || at  || George C. Page Stadium || 13–2 || 3–2 || –
|- align="center" bgcolor="#ccffcc"
| February 17 ||  || Amerige Park || 5–2 || 4–2 || –
|- align="center" bgcolor="#ccffcc"
| February 18 ||  || Amerige Park || 4–3 || 5–2 || –
|- align="center" bgcolor="#ffcccc"
| February 20 || at  || Frank Sancet Stadium || 15–19 || 5–3 || –
|- align="center" bgcolor="#ccffcc"
| February 21 || at Arizona || Frank Sancet Stadium || 22–6 || 6–3 || –
|- align="center" bgcolor="#ccffcc"
| February 22 || at Arizona || Frank Sancet Stadium || 16–5 || 7–3 || –
|- align="center" bgcolor="#ffcccc"
| February 25 ||  || Amerige Park || 4–6 || 7–4 || –
|- align="center" bgcolor="#ccffcc"
| February 28 ||  || Amerige Park || 12–5 || 8–4 || –
|- align="center" bgcolor="#ccffcc"
| February 29 || Illinois || Amerige Park || 12–6 || 9–4 || –
|-

|- align="center" bgcolor="#ccffcc"
| March 1 || Illinois || Amerige Park || 7–4 || 10–4 || –
|- align="center" bgcolor="#ccffcc"
| March 4 || Chapman || Amerige Park || 10–3 || 11–4 || –
|- align="center" bgcolor="#ccffcc"
| March 6 ||  || Amerige Park || 7–0 || 12–4 || –
|- align="center" bgcolor="#ccffcc"
| March 7 || Southern Utah || Amerige Park || 11–2 || 13–4 || –
|- align="center" bgcolor="#ccffcc"
| March 8 || Southern Utah || Amerige Park || 19–0 || 14–4 || –
|- align="center" bgcolor="#ffcccc"
| March 10 ||  || Amerige Park || 6–10 || 14–5 || –
|- align="center" bgcolor="#ffcccc"
| March 13 ||  || Amerige Park || 3–4 || 14–6 || 0–1
|- align="center" bgcolor="#ccffcc"
| March 14 || UC Santa Barbara || Amerige Park || 6–2 || 15–6 || 1–1
|- align="center" bgcolor="#ccffcc"
| March 15 || UC Santa Barbara || Amerige Park || 7–5 || 16–6 || 2–1
|- align="center" bgcolor="#ccffcc"
| March 17 ||  || Amerige Park || 24–4 || 17–6 || 2–1
|- align="center" bgcolor="#ccffcc"
| March 20 || at  || Presley Askew Field || 16–6 || 18–6 || 3–1
|- align="center" bgcolor="#ccffcc"
| March 21 || at New Mexico State || Presley Askew Field || 16–7 || 19–6 || 4–1
|- align="center" bgcolor="#ffcccc"
| March 22 || at New Mexico State || Presley Askew Field || 8–10 || 19–7 || 4–2
|- align="center" bgcolor="#ccffcc"
| March 24 ||  || Amerige Park || 6–4 || 20–7 || 4–2
|- align="center" bgcolor="#ffcccc"
| March 25 || at Cal State Northridge || Matador Field || 4–10 || 20–8 || 4–2
|- align="center" bgcolor="#ccffcc"
| March 27 || at  || Billy Hebert Field || 4–0 || 21–8 || 5–2
|- align="center" bgcolor="#ccffcc"
| March 28 || at Pacific || Billy Hebert Field || 22–6 || 22–8 || 6–2
|- align="center" bgcolor="#ffcccc"
| March 29 || at Pacific || Billy Hebert Field || 2–3 || 22–9 || 6–3
|-

|- align="center" bgcolor="#ffcccc"
| May 1 ||  || Titan Field || 6–8 || 33–14 || 13–6
|- align="center" bgcolor="#ccffcc"
| May 2 || UC Irvine || Titan Field || 6–5 || 34–14 || 14–6
|- align="center" bgcolor="#ccffcc"
| May 8 || at  || San Jose Municipal Stadium || 10–0 || 37–14 || 16–6
|- align="center" bgcolor="#ffcccc"
| May 9 || at San Jose State || San Jose Municipal Stadium || 2–8 || 37–15 || 16–7
|- align="center" bgcolor="#ccffcc"
| May 10 || at San Jose State || San Jose Municipal Stadium || 8–3 || 38–15 || 17–7
|-

|-
! style="" | Postseason
|-

|- align="center" bgcolor="#ccffcc"
| May 21 || vs Ohio State || Alex Box Stadium || 3–2 || 39–15 || 17–7
|- align="center" bgcolor="#ccffcc"
| May 22 || vs  || Alex Box Stadium || 8–0 || 40–15 || 17–7
|- align="center" bgcolor="#ccffcc"
| May 23 || vs  || Alex Box Stadium || 11–0 || 41–15 || 17–7
|- align="center" bgcolor="#ccffcc"
| May 24 || vs Ohio State || Alex Box Stadium || 13–1 || 42–15 || 17–7
|-

|- align="center" bgcolor="#ccffcc"
| May 29 || vs Florida State || Rosenblatt Stadium || 7–2 || 43–15 || 17–7
|- align="center" bgcolor="#ffcccc"
| May 31 || vs Miami (FL) || Rosenblatt Stadium || 3–4 || 43–16 || 17–7
|- align="center" bgcolor="#ccffcc"
| June 2 || vs Florida State || Rosenblatt Stadium || 6–0 || 44–16 || 17–7
|- align="center" bgcolor="#ccffcc"
| June 3 || vs Miami (FL) || Rosenblatt Stadium || 7–5 || 45–16 || 17–7
|- align="center" bgcolor="#ccffcc"
| June 5 || vs Miami (FL) || Rosenblatt Stadium || 8–1 || 46–16 || 17–7
|- align="center" bgcolor="#ffcccc"
| June 6 || vs Pepperdine || Rosenblatt Stadium || 2–3 || 46–17 || 17–7
|-

Awards and honors 
Dante Powell
 Baseball America All-Freshman Team
 All-Big West First Team

James Popoff
 Collegiate Baseball 3rd Team All-American
 All-Big West First Team
 Big West Pitcher of the Year

Phil Nevin
 Golden Spikes Award
 Baseball America Player of the Year
 College World Series Most Outstanding Player
 All-America First Team
 Big West Player of the Year
 All-Big West First Team
 All-Tournament Team

Jason Moler
 ABCA 2nd Team All-American
 Collegiate Baseball 3rd Team All-American
 All-Big West First Team

Dan Naulty
 All-Big West First Team

Titans in the 1992 MLB Draft 
The following members of the Cal State Fullerton Titans baseball program were drafted in the 1992 Major League Baseball Draft.

References 

Cal State Fullerton
Cal State Fullerton Titans baseball seasons
College World Series seasons
Fullerton Titans
Cal State Fullerton